Agnes Martine "Bella" Ouellette (19 October 1886 – 5 December 1945) was a Canadian Québécoise actor who worked mainly in theatre and radio in Montreal, Quebec, Canada.

Biography
Bella Ouellette made her debut acting performance at the age of thirteen alongside Louis Labelle and Blanche de La Sablonnière, famous artists at the time.

Subsequently, Ouellette had a successful career on the stages of Montreal theatres from the early 1900s until the late 1930s. She was the leading actress of the troupe of Julien Daoust. She married Daoust on 14 February 1906 in Ste-Brigide, Montreal.

By the 1920s she was considered one of the grande dammes of Quebec theatre.

The Barry-Duquesne Troupe took up in Montreal's Chanteclerc cinema, which would later be known as the Stella Theatre. The Barry-Duquesne Troupe, accompanied by the Alouette Quatuor, embarked for Paris in 1937 to perform Henry Deyglun's Vers la terre canadienne. It was the first occasion for a Québécoise troupe to stage a Canadian play in France.

Faced with the slump in theatre in Montreal in the later 1930s, Ouellette turned to radio and completed her career in early soap operas such as Claude-Henri Grignon's .

Ouellette married Fred Barry in 1944.

The archival fonds (collection of works) of Fred Barry and Bella Ouellette are preserved in the Montreal archives centre of the Bibliothèque et Archives nationales du Québec (BAnQ).

References

Sources

1886 births
1945 deaths
French Quebecers
Canadian stage actresses
Canadian radio actresses
Actresses from Montreal